Bolinho de chuva (translates roughly as “rain scone”) is a dessert both in Portugal and Brazil.  It is made from flour, eggs, milk and baking powder or baking soda. The doughnuts are deep-fried and sprinkled with cinnamon and sugar.  The name refers to the raindrop shape the batter makes when it hits the oil and to the idea that it is a good rainy day project to make the dish.

The popularity of the bolinho de chuva was enhanced in Brazil by the series of books Sítio do Picapau Amarelo (The Yellow Woodpecker's Ranch) where Aunt Nastácia always made them for Pedrinho, Narizinho and the rag doll Emília.

The bolinho de chuva originated in Portugal and became popular in Brazil thanks to the television show Sítio do Picapau Amarelo, where the cook Tia Nastácia always made these bolinhos for Pedrinho, Narizinho and the cloth doll Emília.

References

See also
Doughnut holes
Oliebol a similar dish from Netherlands
Gulgula, a similar sweet dish from India
Lokma, a similar sweet dish from Turkey
Struffoli, a similar fried dough dish from Naples, Italy

Brazilian cuisine
Doughnuts